Richard G. J. Hutten (born 30 March 1967, in Zwollerkerspel) is a Dutch industrial designer, art director, and artist who is active in furniture design, product design, interior design, and exhibition design.

Biography 
Hutten graduating from the Design Academy Eindhoven in 1991 and started his own design studio  in Rotterdam after the same year.

Hutten has been involved with Droog Design (Dry design) since its inception in 1993 and has been a prominent exponent ever since.

Hutten is known for what he refers to as "No sign of design" furniture: functional furniture in a conceptual and humorous style. Hutten's "Table upon table" concept an example of this style.

He designed the seating for Schiphol Airport in Amsterdam using circular economy principles, so that all materials are either recycled, recyclable or biodegradable.

Work

Exhibitions 

The work of Hutten has also been exhibited in the Netherlands from Rotterdam (Kunsthal and Museum Boijmans van Beuningen), Amsterdam (Stedelijk Museum), Utrecht (Centraal Museum), Den Bosch (Museum het Kruithuis) to Breda (Museum De Beyerd),

In Europe there have been presentati, such as in Ghent, Belgium, in Germany in Berlin,  Bremen (Ubersee Museum), Cologne, Stuttgart (Design Centre) and Weimar and further on in London, Paris, Milan, Verona (Abitare il Tempo), Copenhagen (Louisiana Museum), and Helsinki (Industry Museum & Alvar Aalto Museum).

Outside Europe his work is shown among other places in New York City (Museum of Modern Art), Montreal, Toronto, Tokyo (Idée, E&Y), Osaka,  and San Francisco (Museum of Modern Art).

In 2021, the exhibition “Emphatic: Discovering a Glass Legacy” at Punta Conterie Gallery in Murano, Italy, included works by Hutten, as well as designers Ini Archibong, Noé Duchaufour-Lawrance, GamFratesi, Benjamin Hubert, Luca Nichetto, Elena Salmistraro and Marc Thorpe.

Collections  

Hutten's work is part of the permanent collections in the Netherlands in the Centraal Museum Utrecht, and the Stedelijk Museum in Amsterdam.

Further on his work is present in the Vitra Design Museum in Weil am Rhein, and the San Francisco Museum of Modern Art.

Philippe Starck used some of Huttens designs for the interiors of the Delano Hotel Miami and the Mondrian Hotel Los Angeles.

References

External links
Hutten's official website
Behind the Designs: Interview with Richard Hutten
Video portrait of Richard Hutten (Dutch Profiles)
Richard Hutten - Rijksbureau voor Kunsthistorische Documentatie

1967 births
Living people
People from Zwolle
Design Academy Eindhoven alumni
Dutch furniture designers
Dutch industrial designers
Industrial design